Events in the year 2021 in Andorra.

Incumbents
 Co-Princes: Emmanuel Macron and Joan Enric Vives Sicília
 Prime Minister: Xavier Espot Zamora

Events
Ongoing — COVID-19 pandemic in Andorra

Deaths

24 January – Antoni Puigdellívol, businessman and politician (born 1946).
31 March – Climent Palmitjavila, politician, member of the General Council (born 1940).

References

 
2020s in Andorra
Years of the 21st century in Andorra
Andorra
Andorra